William Ewing Kemp (February 8, 1889 – July 29, 1968) was the mayor of Kansas City, Missouri, from 1946 to 1955.

Biography
Kemp was born on February 8, 1889, in La Monte, Missouri, and received his undergraduate degree from Central Missouri State University. He was a law graduate of Washington University School of Law in 1917 and a veteran of World War I.

In 1940, Kemp was appointed by mayor Joe Gage to be city counsel and prosecuted several city employees in the fall of the Thomas Pendergast machine. He was elected to a two-year term in 1946, re-elected to a three-year term in 1949 and then again re-elected to a four-year term in 1952.

During his tenure the Chouteau Bridge and Paseo Bridge were built across the Missouri River and the Starlight Theatre opened.

References
Kansas City Public Library biography 
Official Manual of Missouri 1939-1940 (reprinted on rootsweb) 

1889 births
1968 deaths
People from Pettis County, Missouri
Mayors of Kansas City, Missouri
Washington University School of Law alumni
20th-century American politicians
University of Central Missouri alumni